The Ankara–Samsun Motorway is a  planned motorway consisting of Ankara–Delice and Delice–Samsun sections that is expected to open in 2023.

Major intersections

Ankara–Kırıkkale–Delice section

Delice–Samsun section

References

Motorways in Turkey
Toll roads in Turkey